Citrus × deliciosa (thorny (Australia), amarillo, beladi, Willowleaf Mandarin, Mediterranean Mandarin) is a citrus hybrid mandarin orange with just under 6 % pomelo ancestry. It is related to the ponkan.

It has been widely grown around the Mediterranean since it appeared in Italy (between 1810 and 1818), but was not found in the orient until it was exported there. It is one of the most commercially important citrus. Its sweet fruit is eaten, its rind oil is used to flavour food and drinks, and petitgrain oil is extracted from the pruned leaves. Its flowers (particularly petals) are also rich in essential oils.

This species produce those which are perhaps the tastiest of all citrus fruits. That's why its scientific name is Citrus × deliciosa, which means delicious citrus.

The production of Mediterranean mandarin has suffered a sharp decline since the middle of the 20th century because of the perishability of the fruits and the tendency for an alternating production with years of low production and years of excessive tree load, but consumers who require more intense citrus aromas and fragrances continue to enjoy this mandarin. Therefore, this mandarin has a commercial space for different markets that value the traditional cultivars. This is the case of the PGI "Citrinos do Algarve". These characteristics and its time of maturity, which implies being little affected by Ceratitis capitata, make Mediterranean mandarin recommended for organic farming.

Cultivars 

 Avana
 Emperor
 Yousef Effendi
 Comuna/commune
 Natal (Mexico)
 Paterno
 Willowleaf (in USA)
 Setubalense

Hybrid descendants 
the Citrus × deliciosa is a parent of some hybrid cultivars like:

 'Clementine' (Citrus × deliciosa × unknown sweet orange).
 'Kinnow', (Citrus × deliciosa × King tangor)
 'Wilking', (Citrus × deliciosa × King tangor)
 'Encore', (Citrus × deliciosa × King tangor)
 'Temple', (Citrus × deliciosa × unknown sweet orange)
 'Cravo', (Citrus × deliciosa × unknown sweet orange)
 'Amoa 8', (Citrus × deliciosa 'Avana' cultivar x Citrus × sinensis 'Moro' cultivar)
 'Allspice' tangelo, (Citrus × deliciosa 'Willowleaf' cultivar x Citrus × paradisi 'Imperial' cultivar)
 'Pearl' tangelo, (Citrus × deliciosa 'Willowleaf' cultivar x Citrus × paradisi 'Imperial' cultivar)

References

Citrus hybrids